Vitaliy Makovetskiy (born 18 January 1967) is a Ukrainian speed skater. He competed in the men's 500 metres event at the 1988 Winter Olympics.

References

1967 births
Living people
Ukrainian male speed skaters
Olympic speed skaters of the Soviet Union
Speed skaters at the 1988 Winter Olympics
Sportspeople from Kyiv